The Alexander Dennis Enviro200 (previously known as the TransBus Enviro200) is a midibus that was manufactured by TransBus International and later Alexander Dennis between 2003 and 2018. The original TransBus Enviro200 design was innovative but ultimately unsuccessful, with few being sold before the introduction of the second generation Enviro200 (originally referred to as the Enviro200 Dart) revived sales for the product from 2006. It was supposed to be positioned in between a minibus and a rigid single-decker bus.

The Enviro200 was originally designed to be the replacement for the Dennis Dart SLF chassis and Alexander ALX200 and Plaxton Pointer 2 bodies. The Enviro200 MMC was launched in 2014, eventually replacing the original Enviro200 and Enviro300, which went out of production in 2018 and 2016 respectively.

Over 6,000 Enviro200s had been built as of July 2017. While most have been for British operators, examples have been exported to Australia, Hong Kong, Malaysia, New Zealand and Spain. From 2017, the Enviro200 was also marketed in North America. Previously, a licence-built version of the model was built by New Flyer Industries and branded the MiDi.

First generation (2003–2007)

The first generation Enviro200, then known as the TransBus Enviro200, was unveiled at Coach & Bus 2003 by the vehicle's then-manufacturer, TransBus International. Two diesel trial buses were initially produced for display in 2003.

The first generation Enviro200 was unique in that it had a door both at the front and at the rear of the bus, as such a layout is rare in the UK - most dual-door buses in the UK have a door at the front and another door around the centre of the bus. This door layout was achieved by placing the engine vertically at the rear offside together with other driveline components, which also created a full low floor layout, common on buses in Continental Europe. The vehicle also incorporated an "Enviro Pack", intended to vent exhaust emissions, noise and heat away from ground level and thus alighting passengers.

The innovative design meant that the Enviro200 could hold up to 25% more passengers than a vehicle of equivalent dimensions (10.4m long, 2.4m wide), with a capacity of 77, with 27 seated.

A single demonstrator of the hybrid variant, the Enviro200H, was produced in 2004 and entered long-term trials in London; however the unconventional engine and door layout, combined with the collapse of TransBus International in 2004, led to the type's commercial failure. As a result, it was the VDL SB120-based Wright Electrocity hybrid electric single-decker bus that was ordered instead by many operators.

Following the collapse of TransBus, the Enviro200 was rebranded as the Alexander Dennis Enviro200 by Alexander Dennis, the successor to TransBus. Only two more first generation Enviro200s were built following the collapse of TransBus, one diesel and one hybrid vehicle, delivered to Far East Travel of Ipswich in early 2007. This pair, and the original London demonstrator, have since passed to Buses Excetera of Guildford.

The first generation Enviro200 was offered alongside the second generation Enviro200 Dart for a time, but received no further orders following 2007 and was retired in favour of the new model. Only five examples were built.

Second generation (2006–2011)

The second generation Enviro200, also known as the Alexander Dennis Enviro200 Dart, was launched in August 2006. The Dart moniker – in reference to the Dennis Dart, from which the Enviro200 Dart was developed – was added in order to prevent confusion with the first generation TransBus Enviro200, which remained in production alongside the Enviro200 Dart for a time.

The second generation Enviro200 retained the conventional rear-engined layout of the Dennis Dart, and was offered with a choice of four or six-cylinder Cummins ISBe Euro IV engines with a range of transmission options, and featured new front and rear axles. It also offered the same seating capacity of the Plaxton Pointer and Alexander ALX200 (which it ultimately replaced) at launch, but with more fixed seats rather than 'tip up' seats for each length. The vehicle also featured integrated chassis and body multiplexing, and cantilevered seats, to reduce weight. Externally, the bus features the same front panel as the double-deck Enviro400, projecting a "family look" onto the two models.

The Enviro200 chassis was also soon made available with Optare Esteem and MCV Evolution bodywork; this was followed in February 2007 by the launch of the Enviro200 body on MAN 14.240 chassis. This gave prospective operators the option of EGR emissions reduction for the Enviro200, as some operators prefer this technology to Cummins' SCR used on the integral design.

In August 2007, due to significant orders for the Enviro400, Alexander Dennis announced that the production of Enviro200 would be moved from its plant at Falkirk to the recently acquired Plaxton factory at Scarborough. This meant that the Scarborough factory would once again be producing the bodywork for a variation of the Dart chassis, while also producing the bodywork for the MAN 14.240 with both Plaxton Centro and Enviro200 bodies simultaneously.

In 2008, Alexander Dennis unveiled the hybrid-electric powered version of Enviro200, known as the Enviro200H, using BAE Systems's HybriDrive series drive system with the Cummins ISBe 4-cylinder engine fitted for power generation.

Third generation (2009–2018)

In 2009, the third generation Enviro200 was launched, dropping the Dart moniker from the previous model. Compared to the previous model, the third generation Enviro200 received a major chassis redesign, including a front-end facelift in order to allow the type to comply with European Community Whole Vehicle Type Approval (ECWVTA) regulations. Some of the major external changes included the introduction of white LED daytime running lights below the headlights, the relocation of the offside emergency door, redesigned front and rear bumpers and the introduction of several new Enviro200 lengths. Additionally, the third generation Enviro200 introduced a Euro V-compliant drivetrain.

The Alexander Dennis Enviro200 MMC was introduced in 2014, as the Enviro200's eventual replacement. Production of the original Enviro200 alongside the Enviro200 MMC continued for a time, with the third generation Enviro200 referred to by Alexander Dennis as the Enviro200 Classic from 2015. Production of the third generation Enviro200 ceased in late 2018.

North America

In May 2012, Canadian bus manufacturer New Flyer introduced a license-built version of the third generation Enviro200 as the New Flyer MiDi, modified for the North American market. New Flyer estimated the size of the medium-sized bus market at approximately 1,000 units per year.

Initially the MiDi was built at the New Flyer factory in St. Cloud, Minnesota. In May 2017 production was transferred to Alexander Dennis's own facility in Nappanee, Indiana, which manufactured the North American variant of the Enviro500 double-decker bus since 2014. The bus now carries the same Enviro200 branding as the international version, and is fully "Buy America" compliant.

Gallery

See also

List of buses

References

External links

Product description of Enviro200 Dart in Alexander Dennis official website
Product description of Enviro200H in Alexander Dennis official website

Enviro200
Hybrid electric buses
Low-floor buses
Midibuses
Vehicles introduced in 2003